Don't Eat the Dirt... is an EP by Sky Cries Mary, released in 1990 through Lively Art.

Track listing

Personnel 
Musicians
Jon Auer – drums, piano, engineering and mixing on "Spanish Castle Magic"
Alfred Butler – bass guitar on "Hellbound for Heaven" and "Tongues"
Scott Mercado – drums on "Hellbound for Heaven" and "Tongues"
Roderick Wolgamott Romero – vocals
Stephan Byron-Salit – guitar on "Hellbound for Heaven" and "Tongues"
Ken Stringfellow – bass guitar on "Spanish Castle Magic" and 
Production and additional personnel
Steve Fisk – engineering and mixing on "Hellbound for Heaven" and "Tongues"
Pascal Magnier – engineering, mixing

References

External links 
 

1990 EPs
Sky Cries Mary albums